Kenneth Reese "Ken" Cole Jr. (January 27, 1938 – August 16, 2001) was an aide to President Richard Nixon, serving his entire administration from 1969 to Nixon's resignation in 1974.  He continued to work in the White House under Gerald Ford.

Cole worked at the J. Walter Thompson advertising agency under H. R. Haldeman and went with Haldeman to work on the Nixon campaign in 1969.  When Nixon was elected, he entered government, working as an assistant to John Ehrlichman and in 1974 became assistant to the president for domestic affairs.

Cole was not implicated in the Watergate scandal—his name does not even appear in Bob Woodward and Carl Bernstein's book All the President's Men.

He died in Willsboro, New York, at age 63.

References
Kenneth Reese Cole Jr., 63, Aide to Nixon. New York Times. August 23, 2001.

1938 births
2001 deaths
Nixon administration personnel
People from Willsboro, New York
United States presidential advisors